The 1869 Bewdley by-election was held on 11 March 1869.  The Parliamentary by-election was called due to the voiding of the 1868 election of the incumbent MP, the Conservative Party's Richard Atwood Glass.  It was won by the Conservative Party candidate John Cunliffe.

On petition Cunliffe was unseated and his liberal opponent Augustus Anson was declared elected.  He was re-elected in the 1874 general election.

References

1869 elections in the United Kingdom
1869 in England
19th century in Worcestershire
By-elections to the Parliament of the United Kingdom in Worcestershire constituencies
Bewdley
March 1869 events